The  is a railway line in Yamagata Prefecture, Japan, operated by East Japan Railway Company (JR East). It connects Kita-Yamagata Station in Yamagata with Aterazawa Station in Ōe. All trains run through to and from Yamagata Station.

Station list
 All stations are located in Yamagata Prefecture.
 All trains stop at every station.
 Trains can pass one another at stations marked "◇", "v", and "^".

Rolling stock
 KiHa 101 DMUs

History

The line was opened to Uzen-Nagasaki in 1921, and extended to Aterazawa the following year. CTC signalling was commissioned on the line in 1982.

Former connecting lines
The Sanzan Electric Railway operated an 11 km line from Uzen-Takamatsu Station to Mazawa, electrified at 600 V DC, between 1926 and 1974.

References

External links

 of the Aterazawa Line (JR East) 

 
Lines of East Japan Railway Company
Rail transport in Yamagata Prefecture
1067 mm gauge railways in Japan
Railway lines opened in 1921